The Beginish house is a stone house and National Monument associated with the Viking period, located in County Kerry, Ireland.

Location
The Beginish house is located in Canroe (An Ceann Rua, "the red headland"), on the eastern part of Beginish Island, an island in Valentia Harbour.

History
The settlement at Beginish was inhabited by Vikings between the 9th and 12th centuries AD.

Description

8 stone houses were associated with field systems, 8 cairns and 15 animal shelters.

A runic inscription was found used as lintel for a house, and a bone pin and comb were found.

References

Buildings and structures in County Kerry
Tourist attractions in County Kerry
National Monuments in County Kerry